Dakota State University (DSU) is a public university in Madison, South Dakota. The school was founded in 1881 as a normal school, or teacher training school. Education is still the university's heritage mission, but a signature mission of technology was added by the state legislature in 1984 to specialize in "programs in computer management, computer information systems, and other related undergraduate and graduate programs."

History

Dakota State University was founded in 1881, eight years before South Dakota became a state. It has been through several name changes:
 1881—Madison Normal School or Dakota State Normal, and was the first school dedicated to training teachers in the Dakota Territory. 
 1902—Madison State Normal School
 1921—Eastern State Normal School was officially adopted: changed to Eastern State Teachers College in 1927.
 1947—General Beadle State Teachers College, after the school's third president William Henry Harrison Beadle (1889–1905); amended to General Beadle State College in 1964.
 1969—Dakota State College
 1989—Dakota State University, to reflect the addition of graduate programs.

The university's homecoming celebration has also undergone several name changes, first Pioneer Day (1922), then Eastern Frontier Day in 1923 (changed because another state's normal schools were using Pioneer Day), Eastern Day (1924-1954), Tutor Day (1955-1970's), and now Trojan Days.

Dr. José-Marie Griffiths is the school's current and 23rd president.

DSU is also home to the Lake County Museum, formerly known as the Smith-Zimmermann Museum  and the Karl E. Mundt Library and archives.

Academics
Dakota State is a National Center of Academic Excellence in Information Assurance Education, designated in 2004 by the National Security Agency. DSU now holds four such distinctions, with awards from the Department of Homeland Security/National Security Agency (NSA) as a National Center of Academic Excellence in: Information Assurance Education, Information Assurance Research, Cyber Operations, and most recently as a Cyber Defense Regional Resource Center.

The 2019 U.S. News & World Report Best Colleges ranking listed the university as tied for #36 in Top Public Schools (Regional Universities Midwest), and tied for #118 overall in Regional Universities Midwest.

Dakota State houses four academic colleges: The College of Education, The Beacom College of Computer and Cyber Sciences, College of Arts and Sciences, and College of Business and Information Systems.

Accreditation and governance
Dakota State is governed by the South Dakota Board of Regents and is accredited by the Higher Learning Commission (HLC), on the AQIP track (Academic Quality Improvement Program). The College of Education is accredited by the CAEP. and the Health Information Management programs are accredited by the Commission on Accreditation for Health Informatics and Information Management. In 2016, the program was named as an Approved Education Partner (AEP) by the Healthcare Information and Management Systems Society (HIMSS).  The undergraduate and business programs are accredited by Accreditation Council for Business Schools and Programs. Respiratory programs are accredited by Commission on Accreditation for Respiratory Care (CoARC).

Institutional Repository - Beadle Scholar
The Institutional Repository (IR) was launched in August 2018 and named "Beadle Scholar," after former university president William Henry Harrison Beadle, who served from 1889 to 1906, when DSU was Madison State Normal School.

Beadle Scholar houses research and major projects by faculty and students including dissertations, theses, posters, and works of art. Information housed on Beadle Scholar is accessible to all people, though some articles might only be available in abstract format, per the copyright agreement with publishers. Disciplines in Beadle Scholar are displayed by category and sub category.

4+1 Program 
DSU offers a 4+1 program where students can obtain their bachelor's and master's degrees in just five years, instead of the usual six years. The program helps students save money by allowing students 9 credits of graduate course work to count toward their undergraduate and graduate degree.

CyberCorps Scholarship 
Dakota State University offers the nation's largest National Science Foundation CyberCorps: Scholarship for service program. The scholarship covers 100% of tuition and fees and additional funding for professional projects. Students who receive this scholarship will also be given $34,000 in stipends each year. Recipients also receive paid summer internships and guaranteed cyber employment in the government. This scholarship can be renewed for up to 3 years and each year requires the student to commit to a government job after graduation.

Student life 
Enrollment has grown from two graduates in its first class in 1885, to 3,190 students enrolled in the fall of 2016. Of those, 2,844 are undergraduates and 346 are postgraduate students. On-campus students number 2,754; 1,134 are Internet-only students. Students come from 49 states and 59 countries.

The average student/faculty ratio is 17/1. For undergraduates, the average class size is 15.3 students; for graduate students, on-campus class size is 4.1. More than $18 million in financial aid was awarded in 2015.

Students may choose from over 45 campus clubs and campus and national organizations. The school also has a comprehensive student services program, including career services, international programs, Student Success Center (counseling, academic probation, wellness, tutoring), diversity and inclusion and Title III services.

The placement rate for DSU's graduates is over 94 percent; several programs have 100 percent placement.

Cyber competitions 
DSU has an information security team which regularly competes against other collegiate teams in multiple competitions, one of which is the National Collegiate Cyber Defense Competition. DSU's team was among the finalists in the years 2009, 2014, 2016, and 2018. In 2013 and 2022, the team won second place. In 2018, the team won third place. In the 2017 Argonne National Laboratory Cyber Defense Competition where fifteen collegiate teams from around the country competed, DSU placed in second as well, in tie with Kansas State University.

Physical campus
The historic portion of the 61-acre campus includes five buildings facing an open lawn area called the "Campus Green". The oldest building on campus is Beadle Hall, built in 1886. The newest building is the Beacom Institute of Technology.

As of 2017, plans are also underway for a new cyber research and development facility and organization called the Madison Cyber Labs or MadLabs. As of 2019, the MadLabs building has finished construction. Renovations to the school's athletic facilities are also in the planning stages.

Residence halls 
Student housing consists of six different buildings ranging from dorms to suites.

 Emry Hall
 Higbie Hall
 Richardson Hall
 The Courtyard
 Zimmermann Hall
 8-Plexes
Van Eps Place
Residence Village - This residence hall is planned to be opened fall of 2021.  It will have 120 beds, and the rooms are suite and apartment style rooms.

Athletics
The Dakota State athletic teams are called the Trojans and Lady T's. The university is a member of the National Association of Intercollegiate Athletics (NAIA), primarily competing in the North Star Athletic Association (NSAA) as a founding member since the 2013–14 academic year. The Trojans and Lady T's previously competed as an NAIA Independent within the Association of Independent Institutions (AII) from 2011–12 to 2012–13; and in these defunct conferences: the Dakota Athletic Conference (DAC) from 2000–01 to 2010–11; and the South Dakota Intercollegiate Conference (SDIC) from 1917–18 to 1999–2000.

Dakota State competes in 12 intercollegiate varsity sports: Men's sports include baseball, basketball, cross country, football, and track & field (indoor and outdoor); while women's sports include basketball, cross country, softball, track and field (indoor and outdoor) and volleyball; and co-ed sports include eSports.

Accomplishments
Dakota State University teams have won 56 conference championships and produced 80 All-Americans (14 women, 66 men). Also, 112 DSU athletes have been named NAIA All-Scholar athletes. There have been 856 Trojans who have received the distinction of being cited an All-Conference athlete (230 football, 135 track, 75 baseball, 70 cross country, 66 softball, 60 volleyball, 50 women's basketball and 44 men's basketball).

Campus media
KDSU is a college campus radio station which broadcasts only in the Student Union and online at kdsu.net. The station plays many genres of music, from rock and metal to country and alternative.

The Sigma Tau Delta honor society releases a yearly zine-like publication, New Tricks, of student and faculty work that includes poetry and art.

The Trojan Times is the student newspaper.

Notable alumni (graduated in)
Richard Barrett Lowe (1929) - writer and director of the 1929 film "Dakotah," filmed with DSU faculty and staff (no copies remain); 42nd Governor of American Samoa, eighth American Governor of Guam.
Miles Beacom (1981) - President and CEO of Premier Bankcard and of First Premier Financial Services
 Susan Bulfer Koch (1972) - Chancellor of University of Illinois-Springfield
 Ruth Habeger (1917) - Longtime science and math teacher, the science building is named after her
Shantel Krebs (1998) - Former South Dakota Secretary of State

References

External links

 
 Dakota State Athletics website
 

 
Education in Lake County, South Dakota
Public universities and colleges in South Dakota
Buildings and structures in Lake County, South Dakota